Kevin Riepl is an American composer for video games, films and television shows. He is best known for his work on the Unreal series of games, Gears of War and Aliens: Colonial Marines.

Biography 
Riepl was born in Cliffwood Beach, New Jersey. His interest in music started at the age of six, when he began to play piano and guitar under the instruction of his uncle. In the fourth grade he began studies on the trumpet and piano and that continued throughout his high school years in which he was a member of a variety of bands and orchestras. After high school, he began private independent studies in composition and orchestration at the Village East Conservatory of Music. Following the years at the conservatory and few scoring projects, he attended Mannes College of Music in New York City for further education in composition and orchestration.

Riepl began his career working as an assistant and co-writing partner for Kevin Manthei in the early 2000s. At the time, Cliff Bleszinski, former design director at Epic Games, who was then looking for a different musical sound for the Unreal franchise, played his demo reel. This led him to work on Unreal Tournament 2003, Unreal Tournament 2004 and Unreal Championship 2. In February 2005, Riepl became attached to Gears of War. Initially, he was asked to write the main themes for the game, but after submitting the pieces he had written, Epic liked what he created and signed him on to create the entire score. In March 2007, Riepl recorded the score for the massively multiplayer first-person shooter computer game Huxley, developed by Webzen Games.

In October 2010, Riepl suffered a sudden heart failure and was hospitalized. He had a pump installed in his heart until a donor heart could replace it, and underwent the heart transplant in July 2011. Shortly afterwards, a rare tumor was found on his adrenal gland, which was affecting his blood pressure. He has since made a good recovery.

In addition to his work on the video game industry, Riepl has composed for films and television series, including his recent scores for horror films such as Silent Night, Contracted and the Cabin Fever films (Patient Zero and the 2016 film remake).

Credits 
Kevin Riepl has composed music for the following media:

Video games

Films

Television

References

External links 
 

 

Living people
American male composers
21st-century American composers
Musicians from New Jersey
Year of birth missing (living people)
American television composers
21st-century American male musicians